Throwdown! with Bobby Flay is a Food Network television program in which celebrity chef Bobby Flay challenges cooks renowned for a specific dish or type of cooking to a cook-off of their signature dish.

At the beginning of each show, Flay receives – via bicycle messenger – a package detailing the chef he is to compete against as well as the dish. Examples of opponents include a skilled chili maker or a famous wedding cake designer. After practicing and preparing the item in question, Flay shows up for a surprise competition (or "Throwdown"). During the competition, both chefs prepare their particular version of the dish, and both are then evaluated by local judges to determine a winner.

Format
Each show includes a mini-biography about the chef who is to be challenged, shown before the challenge takes place.  The content for the biography is actually collected as part of an elaborate ruse or setup, where the chef or cook is told that they are going to be featured on a fictitious Food Network show. As part of the show, the featured chef (and their associated restaurant, if any) hosts a small party, which is then unexpectedly "crashed" by Bobby Flay. Upon Flay's arrival, he reveals the true nature of the show, and the "Throwdown" is initiated.
	
In the Food Network's test kitchen, Flay and his two sous-chefs (Stephanie Banyas and Miriam Garron) experiment and prepare the particular dish, often opting for a variant of the dish.

When Flay makes his appearance at a rival's event, he is usually greeted with surprise and confusion, although there has been one occasion where the challenged chef figured out that Flay would be appearing for a throwdown and ended up challenging him.  Flay's comment was that he "had been set up." However, the rival usually quickly gets over the initial shock and warms up to the challenge. After the dishes are prepared, the two chefs taste each other's creations and are usually quite complimentary towards one another. Finally, the dishes are evaluated by one or more connoisseurs or notable veterans in that field (via a blind taste test), with the winner then being announced.

Each episode ends with a challenge from Flay looking directly into the camera and saying, "All you chefs keep doing what you do, but ask yourself this..." Finished by the featured chef saying "are you ready for a Throwdown?"

The format of the show does not edit or disguise Flay's lack of knowledge of technique regarding cooking for the challenge. He often makes use of New York City-area experts to teach him basic techniques. In other instances, he acknowledges the traditional approach to the dish but then explains how he will make it more modern or more his own style of cooking with various added ingredients.

Flay's record is 32 wins, 1 tie, and 68 losses. Flay has a winning record (5 wins and 4 losses) with cake challenges, winning throwdowns for cheesecake and cupcakes in season 2, coconut cake and red velvet cake in season 5, and German chocolate cake in season 6. Flay lost throwdowns for wedding cake in season 1, Bûche de Noël in season 5, and Carrot cake and Pineapple Upside-down cake in season 8.

Episodes

Season 1

Season 2

Season 3

: Highlights aired on Paula's Party 
: Jack Serio died soon after this episode aired. A remembrance graphic appeared at the end of the program.

Season 4

:  A special "Rematch on the Grill" episode featuring 3 former Throwdown contestants. Ellis showed up at the Throwdown itself to challenge Flay separately.

Season 5

Season 6

Season 7

Season 8

References

External links
Throwdown! with Bobby Flay at Foodnetwork.com
Map of Throwdown restaurants

Food Network original programming
2000s American cooking television series
2010s American cooking television series
2006 American television series debuts
2010 American television series endings